The 1995 Kilkenny Senior Hurling Championship was the 101st staging of the Kilkenny Senior Hurling Championship since its establishment by the Kilkenny County Board. The championship began on 13 August 1995 and ended on 13 October 1995.

Tullaroan were the defending champions, however, they were defeated by Fenians in the first round.

On 15 October 1995, Glenmore won the title after a 3–19 to 1–14 defeat of Fenians in the final at Nowlan Park. It was their fourth championship title overall and their first title in three championship seasons.

Team changes

To Championship

Promoted from the Kilkenny Intermediate Hurling Championship
 Mooncoin

From Championship

Relegated to the Kilkenny Intermediate Hurling Championship
 Mullinavat

Results

First round

Relegation play-offs

Quarter-finals

Semi-finals

Final

Championship statistics

Miscellaneous

Graigue-Ballycallan qualified for the semi-final stages of the championship for the first time in 38 years.

References

Kilkenny Senior Hurling Championship
Kilkenny Senior Hurling Championship